Nicole Chamoun (born 1984) is an Australian actress.  She played the role of Zahra Al-Biyati in 2018's Safe Harbour for which she was nominated for the 2018 Logie Award for Most Outstanding Supporting Actress and the 2018 AACTA Award for Best Guest or Supporting Actress in a Television Drama. In On the Ropes she played Amirah Al-Amir and was nominated for the 2019 Logie Award for Most Outstanding Actress.

Filmography

TV 
Kick (2007) TV series - Layla Salim (13 episodes)
City Homicide (2007) TV series - Selma Al Basri (1 episode)
Jack and Franki: Act 1 (2015) TV movie - Hairdresser
Ronny Chieng: International Student (2017) TV series - Pharmacist (1 episode)
The Doctor Blake Mysteries (2017) TV series - Afina Draghici (1 episode)
On the Ropes (2018) TV mini series - Amirah Al-Amir (4 episode)
Safe Harbour (2018) TV mini series - Zahra Al-Bayati (4 episodes)
Romper Stomper (2018) TV series - Laila (6 episodes)
Troppo (2022) TV series - Amanda Pharrell (Main cast)

Film 
Last Dance (2012) - Travel Agent
10 Terrorists (2012) - Show's Sound Recordist

References

External links
 

Australian people of Lebanese descent
Australian television actresses
Living people
1984 births